Nabyla Maan (born December 6, 1987) is a Moroccan singer-songwriter.

Biography 
Nabyla recorded her first album in 2005 "D'nya", in which she sings in Darija Arabic, Classical Arabic and French, including two reprises of Nass El Ghiwane's famous songs "Allah Ya Molana" and "Essiniya". Her album sold hundreds of thousands of copies and allowed her to be showcased in concerts in Morocco and Europe. At age 19, she was the youngest Amazigh and African artist to perform at the Olympia music hall in Paris.

In 2009, she released her second album "Ya Tayr El Ali", which also featured songs in Moroccan Arabic, Classic Arabic and French, including her version of Edith Piaf's "Padam Padam". Nabyla Maan is considered a world music artist with Arabic, Western, and African influences.

Discography

Albums 

 D'nya (2005)

 Morok'Oh- Instrumental
 D'nya- Moroccan Arabic
 Le Bal Masqué- French
 Allah Ya Moulana- Moroccan Arabic
 Essiniya -Moroccan Arabic
 Hina Qalat-Classic Arabic
 Laghzal Fatma-Classic Arabic
  Adorable – French
 Entre Les Lignes – French
 Illusions- French
 Poupée d'Argile- French
 A Lalla Y Lalli -Moroccan Arabic duet with Said Moskir
 Ya Tayr El Ali (2009)

 Ya Tayr El Ali – Moroccan Arabic
 La Toli – Classic Arabic
 J'Ai Peur de Te Dire – French
 Je Te Tatoue – French
 Kan Nady -Moroccan Arabic
 Ewa Tkalam -Moroccan Arabic
 Lema La Ohib – Classic Arabic
 Lekram Lamrassaâ – Moroccan Arabic
 Padam Padam – French
 Ya Rouhi – Moroccan Arabic
 Ya Woulidi – Moroccan Arabic
 Ana Wa Enta – Moroccan Arabic

  Vis ta vie (2013)

Singles 

  Khtar (2010) 
  Hki li (2011)

References

External links 
 Official Website

1987 births
Living people
21st-century Moroccan women singers
Singers who perform in Classical Arabic